The 2006 Giro del Trentino was the 30th edition of the Tour of the Alps cycle race and was held on 18 April to 21 April 2006. The race started and finished in Arco. The race was won by Damiano Cunego.

General classification

References

2006
2006 in road cycling
2006 in Italian sport